Justicia pycnophylla is a plant native to the Cerrado vegetation of Brazil.

External links
 Justicia pycnophylla

pycnophylla
Flora of Brazil